Regensen (original Latin name: Collegium Domus Regiæ, English: The College of the Royal House) is a residential college for students at the University of Copenhagen and Technical University of Denmark (DTU). It is situated in the heart of the old city, right next to the Rundetårn (the Round Tower).

History

Commissioned by King Christian IV and inaugurated by Royal Charter by on 1 July 1623, Regensen has for centuries provided a unique living and working environment for 100 students. Some of the buildings burned down along with the rest city in the Great Fire of Copenhagen in 1728, but was rebuilt the same year.

Regensen's mission is to provide housing to talented yet non-privileged students at the University of Copenhagen (KU) and the Technical University of Denmark (DTU). Until the 1980s, the foundation behind Regensen, Kommunitetet, provided free housing and a scholarship for students chosen for admission. Because of financial difficulties, a small fee was introduced, which helps to contribute toward the cost of utilities, which today is around DKK 1,600 per month. This is still well under housing price levels in Copenhagen and Regensen thus continues to provide financial stability for its students. This is why living in Regensen is considered as a scholarship.

It is the second oldest of the old dormitories of the University of Copenhagen, and many old student traditions live on making the place very lively. Danish citizens studying at the University of Copenhagen or the Technical University of Denmark who have completed two years of full-time studies (120 ECTS points) and have an average grade of at least 7 (in the Danish grading system), can be considered for admission to one of its 100 rooms. Applications are open twice a year, corresponding with the start of the Spring and Autumn semesters. Applications are typically quite competitive, with more than 200 applications for around 5 to 10 spots.

Since 2013, once a year, two scholarships for foreign students are awarded in honour of Jonas Thomsen Sekyere.

Many of Denmark's major social and political debates through the ages have taken shape in the College, through the many prominent alumni ranging from scientists to dramatists, novelists, poets and politicians. Regensen is also characterised by an intricate calendar of special feast days that are observed in the Great Hall with a complex array of festive traditions.

Provost 
The Provost (original Danish name: Regensprovsten) is an employed researcher at the University of Copenhagen who lives at Regensen, typically with a family. The role of the provost is special, but can perhaps best be compared to a superintendent. In Anglo-Saxon countries, the term provost is used for a similar position. The powers of the provost are demarcated in the Regensen's democracy, which is rooted in the General Assembly and the Great Regens Council. At other older dormitories, an efor is associated with approximately the same functions, but typically without residing in the dormitories, like Valkendorfs, Borchs, Elers. Once a semester, the Provost invites the new residents and the Klokkers for dinner in their home. It is a cozy gathering, which gives the Provost the chance to get to know the new students and vice versa.

Clubs 
The residents of Regensen organize themselves in small 'clubs' in which they gather to eat, drink and socialize. The current clubs are: 'Gamle' ('Old'), 'Siqno', 'Konvencio' (formerly Konventet), 'PIP' (Primus Inter Pares), 'Ping', 'Skrap' (Skræp - a sword owned by a danish mythical king), 'HOF' (Carlsbergs HOF), 'Tilia', and 'Uglen' ('The Owl').

Governance 
Here are some of the political/governance events that make up during the year at Regensen:

The General Assembly 
In happens at the beginning of each semester, and the duty of the assembly is mainly approve the budget of the previous year, and select new students for internal posts ('embeder'). The Assembly  happens at midnight in the Grand Hall, and is preceded by dinners in the Societies spread across Regensen, where negotiations take place in order to secure certain posts. In this way, many deals are made before the official democratic vote.

Little Regens Council Meeting 
It happens during each semester, once or twice, and is announced by the Klokker. Here, the main problems and questions of the Regensians are exposed, and an agenda is produced. Regensians can also apply for funding to spend in projects or initiatives, which are voted by the meeting itself.

Large Regens Council Meeting 
At the Large Regens Council Meeting, the Regensians make proposals, which can be voted through at the General Assembly. These might concern statute changes, financial support for projects and initiatives, and appointments of internal posts (embeder). It is also during this meeting that the budget from each internal post is presented and approved. These meetings are often characterized by long discussions about traditions, renewals and statutes.

Famous residents 

 Ole Borch (1626-90), chemist, Borchs Kollegiums founder
 Thomas Kingo (1634-1703),  bishop and poet
 Hans Gram (1685-1748), historiographer, head of the Royal library
 Hans Adolph Brorson (1694-1764), bishop and hymnal
 Søren Gyldendal (1742-1802), bookseller and publisher
 Steen Steensen Blicher (1782-1848), author and pastor
 Rasmus Rask (1787-1832), linguist
 Poul Martin Møller (1794-1838), author and philosopher
 Christian Winther (1796–1876), poet
 Andreas Peter Berggreen (1801-1880), composer, creator of the four-part student song
 Johan Nicolai Madvig (1804-86) philologist and politician
 Ditlev Gothard Monrad (1811-1887), bishop and theologian, council president
 Carl Ploug (1813-94), poet, editor, politician
 Japetus Steenstrup (1813-97), zoologist and archaeologist
 Jens Christian Hostrup (1818-92), poet and priest
 Rasmus Malling-Hansen (1835-1890), priest, superintendent, inventor
 Viggo Hørup (1841-1902), politician and journalist, co-founder of Politiken
 Niels Ryberg Finsen (1860-1904), medicines, Nobel laureate
 Vilhelm Buhl (1881-1954), Social Democratic Prime Minister
 Julius Bomholt (1896-1969), high school principal and Social Democratic minister
 Kaj Munk (1898-1944), priest and poet
 Jørgen-Frantz Jacobsen (1900-38), Faroese author and historian
 Regin Prenter (1907-90), theologian, professor
 Jens Otto Krag (1914-78), Social Democratic Prime Minister
 K. B. Andersen (1914-83), Minister of Social Democracy, Speaker of the Folketing
 Simon Spies (1921-1984), travel king
 Erik Amdrup (1923-1998), surgeon and author
 Mogens Glistrup (1926-2008), politician and lawyer

External links
Homepage in Danish
Homepage for former residents (Danish)

University of Copenhagen
Technical University of Denmark
University and college residential buildings in Copenhagen